Papaya Coconut is a studio album from Swedish pop singer Kikki Danielsson, released in November 1986. All the songs were written and composed by Lasse Holm and Ingela "Pling" Forsman. The song "Nashville, Tennessee" is from the 1986 television programme Kikki i Nashville. The album was on the Swedish Albums Chart around new year 1986-1987, and peaked at number 29 on the chart.

Track listing

Side A

Side B

Contributing musicians
vocals: Kikki Danielsson
drums: Klas Anderhell
Bass: Rutger Gunnarsson, Anders Engberg
Guitar: Lasse Wellander, Lasse Jonsson, Hasse Rosén
Keyboards: Peter Ljung, Kjell Öhman, Lasse Holm
Accordion: Kjell Öhman
Wind instruments: Urban Agnas, Leif Lindvall, Erik Häusler, Joakim Milder
Wind arrangements: Leif Lindvall
Chorus: Vicki Benckert, Liza Öhman, Lasse Westman, Lennart Sjöholm, Lasse Holm
Strings from Sveriges Radios Symfoniorkester.

Recorded and mixed in KMH Studio in Stockholm, Sweden in September–October 1986.

Technicians: Åke Groho
Cover design: Fri Reklam
Fotography: Michael Engström
Production: KM Records
Arrangement: Lennart Sjöholm

Svensktoppen
Three of the songs from this album were tested on the Swedish hitlist Svensktoppen.
The song "Rädda pojkar" charted at Svensktoppen for four weeks between 29 June–21 September 1986 (including the summer break), peaking at 5th position.
The song "En timme försent" charted at Svensktoppen for nine weeks between 30 November 1986–1 February 1987, peaking at third position.-1987,
The song "Papaya Coconut" was on Svensktoppen for 12 weeks between 11 January–29 March 1987, peaking at first position.

Album cover
One side of the inner covers advertised for Danielsson's holiday village Orfa, which is located between Bollnäs and Ljusdal, and a discount coupon authorizing 10% discount for cottage renting during 1987.

Charts

References

1986 albums
Kikki Danielsson albums
Swedish-language albums